The Mystic River Jewish Communities Project is a non-profit organization dedicated to preserving the heritage of the Mystic River  Jewish communities of Chelsea, East Boston, Everett, Malden, Medford, Revere, Somerville, and Winthrop, Massachusetts.

Museum project
The project is working on the restoration of the 1903 Gothic revival chapel of the Temple Ohabei Shalom Cemetery, located at Wordsworth & Horace Streets in East Boston, Massachusetts, for use as a museum.

References

External links
 Mystic River Jewish Communities Project
Jewish Cemetery Association of Massachusetts

Jewish-American history
Jewish museums in the United States
Jews and Judaism in Massachusetts
Museums in Boston
Proposed museums in the United States
Gothic Revival architecture in Massachusetts